Reaktionsmotor 12 (RM12) is a low-bypass afterburning turbofan jet engine developed for the Saab JAS 39 Gripen fighter. A version of the General Electric F404, the RM12 was produced by Volvo Aero (now GKN Aerospace Engine Systems). The last of the 254 engines was produced on 24 May 2011, at which time it had reached 160,000 flight hours without any serious incidents.

Development 
The whole JAS-project was complicated already without considering the parliamentary aspects, where an not insignificant minority spread over the party-lines either was principally against the military industry or opposed the growing costs of developing a domestic aircraft. The four main companies in IG JAS then were negotiating with the Överbefälhavaren (High Commander). chief of the airforce and Försvarets Materielverk (FMV), along with other major actors with different competences and areas of responsibility, while the Ministry of Defence interfered at random to prove that they were keeping things in control.

In an effort to get enough support for the JAS project, Saab had promised to cut the costs to the point where the previous Viggen was 50% more expensive than the new one. Somehow, this had been turned around into a promise to make the new aircraft 50% smaller than the 37, and that was where IG JAS found themselves stuck after a timid statement about what they actually had said resulted in accusations of reneging on their promise. Continuous studies done by FMV and Volvo Flygmotor AB (VFA)  throughout the 1970s meant the candidates for what the new engine should be based on were quickly reduced to Pratt & Whitney F100 that would have resulted in an aircraft larger than the targeted 50%, or the smaller Turbo-Union RB199 and General Electric F404-400 that did not offer enough performance. FMV had informal contacts the Israelis who were looking for an engine for their IAI Lavi as well as with P&W. Rather than joining in for the P&W PW1120, IG JAS went for the GE offer of an updated engine that had promise of low cost maintenance, the F404J.

This engine featured a more resilient first fan, a slightly higher turbine temperature. The F404's analogue Engine Control Unit was replaced with the Digital Engine Control, jointly developed by Volvo and GE, which communicates with the cockpit through the digital data buses and, as redundancy, a hydromechanical back-up. It was decided that GE would produce 65% of the engine and send it as a kit to VFA, who would manufacture the remaining 35% of the parts and be responsible for final assembly and testing.

Design
Produced by Volvo Aero, the RM12 is a derivative of the General Electric F404J. The fan was completely redesigned with thickened first stage blades which deform (causing the thrust loss) but do not fracture or cause downstream damage to pass more flow for higher thrust and to be more tolerant of a bird-strike.  include a better tolerance to birdstrikes with minimal thrust loss (6% was achieved during a test, after ingesting a half-kilogram (1.1 lb) pigeon-size bird at take-off conditions), adjustable stators behind the inlet vanes before the fans and the compressor stages to optimise airflow regardless of speed and AoA,  redesigned and doubled circuit ignition systems, the 1996 development of 50W a full authority digital engine control (FADEC) system with a mechanical calculator as seamless backup, and a completely redesigned, internally cooled flame holder for the afterburner.

Several subsystems and components were also redesigned to reduce maintenance demands, including a modular design that split the engine into 7 distinct parts that can be replaced independently. The air intakes of the engine were designed to minimize radar reflection from the engine fan, reducing the radar cross section of the aircraft overall. Elements such as the fan/compressor discs and case, compressor spool, hubs, seals, and afterburner are manufactured in Sweden, final assembly also taking place there.

Applications
 IAI Nammer (as designed, not built)
 Saab JAS 39A/B/C/D Gripen

Specifications (RM12)

See also

References

External links

 RM12 page on GKN website
 GE Aviation RM12
 

Low-bypass turbofan engines
1980s turbofan engines